This is a list of English football transfers for the 2009 summer transfer window. Only moves featuring at least one Premier League or Championship club are listed.

The summer transfer window opened on 1 July 2009 and closed at 17:00 BST on 1 September 2009. Players without a club may join one at any time, either during or in between transfer windows. Clubs outside the Premier League may also sign players on loan at any time. If need be, clubs may sign a goalkeeper on an emergency loan, if all others are unavailable.

Transfers

 Player officially joined his new club on 1 July 2009.

Notes and references
General

Specific

Transfers Summer 2009
Summer 2009
English